Lopburi Line is a railway line of Greater Bangkok Commuter rail, operated by State Railway of Thailand (SRT). The line is all double track. There are seven commuter train services on the line. Main destinations such as Rangsit, Ayutthaya, and Lopburi.

Services 
 Commuter train no. 301 Bangkok-Lopburi
 Commuter train no. 303 Bangkok-Lopburi (diesel multiple unit)
 Commuter train no. 311 Bangkok-Rangsit (diesel multiple unit)
 Commuter train no. 313 Bangkok-Ban Phachi
 Commuter train no. 317 Bangkok-Lopburi (diesel multiple unit)

See also 
 Greater Bangkok Commuter rail
 Chiang Mai Main Line
 Northern Line (Thailand)
 Kaeng Khoi Line
 Northeastern Line (Thailand)
 Lop Buri Railway Station
 SRT Dark Red Line
 Bangkok Elevated Road and Train System (Hopewell)

References 

Railway lines in Thailand
Metre gauge railways in Thailand